Philippopolis (Φιλιππόπολις, or Φιλιπούπολις) is one of the names of the ancient city (amongst which are Thracian Eumolpia/Pulpudeva, Roman Trimontium) situated where Plovdiv is today. The city became one of the largest and most important in the region and was called "the largest and most beautiful of all cities" by Lucian. During most of its recorded history, the city was known by the name Philippopolis after Philip II of Macedon. Philippopolis became part of the Roman empire and capital of the Roman province of Thracia. According to Ammianus Marcellinus, Philippopolis had a population of 100,000 in the Roman period.

Philippopolis was in a fertile region on the banks of the Maritsa River (the ancient Hebrus).

History

Pre-Roman history

The earliest signs of habitation on the territory of Philippopolis date as far back as the 6th millennium BC when the first settlements were established. Archaeologists have discovered fine pottery and objects of everyday life on Nebet Tepe from as early as the Chalcolithic, showing that at the end of the 4th millennium BC, there already was an established settlement there. Thracian necropolises dating back to the 2nd-3rd millennium BC have been discovered, while the Thracian town Eumolpias was established between the 2nd and the 1st millennium BC.

The walled town was built by the Thracian tribe of the Bessi. In 516 BC during the rule of Darius the Great, Thrace was included in the Persian empire. In 492 BC the Persian general Mardonius subjected Thrace again, and it became nominally a vassal of Persia until the early rule of Xerxes I. From 479 BC the town was included in the Odrysian kingdom, a Thracian tribal union.

The town was conquered by Philip II of Macedon in 342 BC, (giving his name to the new city) and the Odrysian king was deposed. This marked the expansion of the city with an organised Greek street plan. Ten years after the Macedonian invasion  the Odrysian king Seuthes III revolted against Alexander the Great's rule resulting in neither victory, nor defeat, but stalemate. Under Macedonian suzerainty the Thracian kings re-established their kingdom and started to exercise influence again.

The city was destroyed by the Celts as part of the Celtic settlement of Eastern Europe, most likely in the 270s BC. 

In 183 BC Philip V of Macedon conquered the city, but shortly afterwards the Thracians re-conquered it.

Roman history

In 72 BC the city was seized by the Roman general Marcus Lucullus during the Third Mithridatic War but was soon restored to Thracian control. In AD 46 the city was finally incorporated into the Roman Empire by emperor Claudius. It gained city status (municipium) in the late 1st century. As Trimontium it was an important crossroad for the Roman Empire and was called "the largest and most beautiful of all cities" by Lucian. Although it was not the capital of the Province of Thrace at this time (which was Perinthus), the city was the largest and most important centre in the province. It was the seat of the Union of Thracians and the Via Militaris (or Via Diagonalis), the most important military road in the Balkans, passed through the city. Roman times were a period of growth and cultural excellence and the ancient ruins tell a story of a vibrant, growing city with numerous public buildings, shrines, baths, theatres and a stadium. The large scale of public construction during the Flavian Dynasty (69-96 AD) led to the city being named Flavia Philippopolis.

Hadrian (r. 117-138) visited the city as part of his tour of the empire and a triumphal arch was erected outside the east gate in his honour. 

In 172, a second wall was built to encompass part of the city which had already extended out of the Three Hills into the valley, but leaving other parts outside unprotected.

It became the provincial capital of Thrace in the early 3rd century.

In about 250 the Battle of Philippopolis involved a long siege by the Goths led by their ruler Cniva. After betrayal by a disgruntled citizen who showed them where to scale the walls, the city was burned and 100,000 of its citizens died or were taken captive according to Ammianus Marcellinus.

The city had contracted until the middle of the 4th century but then prospered later in the 4th century, like many cities in the region, and started spreading across the plain again. Philippopolis regained its size of the 3rd century, at its greatest prosperity. This expansion is shown by new large buildings on the acropolis (Trimontium) and also across the plain, such as the eastern baths and large Basilica.

However, it was destroyed again by Attila's Huns in 441–2 and by the Goths of Theodoric Strabo in 471.

Middle Ages

Philippopolis fell to the Bulgars of the First Bulgarian Empire in 863, during the reign of Boris I, having been briefly abandoned by the Christian inhabitants in 813 during a dispute with the khan Krum.
 After this the settlement contracted, though it remained a major city, with the city walls rebuilt and new Christian basilicas and Roman baths constructed in the 4th century. During the Byzantine–Bulgarian wars, the emperor Basil the Bulgar-Slayer used Philippopolis as a major strategic fortification, governed by the protospatharios Nikephoros Xiphias. 

In the middle 11th century, the city was attacked by the Pechenegs, who occupied it briefly around 1090. The city continued to prosper, with the walls restored in the 12th century, during which the historian and politician Niketas Choniates was its governor and the physician Michael Italikos was its metropolitan bishop. According to the Latin historian of the Fourth Crusade, Geoffrey of Villehardouin, Philippopolis was the third largest city in the Byzantine Empire, after Constantinople (Istanbul) and Thessalonica (Thessaloniki). 

It suffered damage from the armies passing through the city during the Crusades as well as from sectarian violence between the Eastern Orthodox and the Armenian Orthodox and Paulician denominations. During the Third Crusade, Frederick I camped in Philippopolis from 26 August to 5 November 1189.

The city was destroyed by Kaloyan of Bulgaria in 1206 and rebuilt thereafter. In 1219, the city became the capital of the Crusader Duchy of Philippopolis, part of the Latin Empire. The Second Bulgarian Empire recovered the city in 1263, but lost it to Byzantine control before recapturing it in 1323. The Ottoman Empire conquered Philippopolis in 1363 or 1364.

Urban development and archaeology

The layout of Philippopolis was revealed to a large extent by archaeology between 1965-85 which, with historical records, confirm the presence of three archaeological levels: Hellenistic, Roman and Late Roman.

Hellenistic period

The town originally built on the hills, starting from the original Thracian settlement on Nebet Tepe and the Three Hills in general, was extended to the plain in the Hellenistic period. The initial planning and construction of Philippopolis started during Philip II's rule (359–336 BC) and continued during the reign of Alexander the Great and the Diadochi. Despite the unstable political and economic environment from the 4th century BC to the 1st century BC, large-scale urban planning and complex construction techniques were implemented. 

The Hippodamian street plan was applied to Philippopolis as in other ancient towns like Miletus, Ephesus, Alexandria and Olynthus. Hellenistic Philippopolis had a network of orthogonal gravel streets. Some of the streets had pavements, curbs and cambers to accommodate rain water drainage. The intersecting streets formed rectangular city blocks (insulae) with residential and public buildings. A great number of public buildings were built such as theatre, agora, and temples. 

The first city wall of Philippopolis was built as early as the 4th century BC and fragments of this fortification system are visible today on the northern and northwest slopes of Nebet Tepe. The wall was provided with small gates that led to passages or tunnels inside the rock through which steps reached the northern foot of the hill.

Roman period

The urban planning model from the Hellenistic period was followed and developed after the city became part of the Roman empire. The Romans continued the legacy left by the Greek architects; the unit of measure used by the Romans (the Roman foot - 296 mm) coincided almost entirely with the Attica step used in the Hellenistic period thus allowing them to easily follow the initial urban planning model of the town without making significant alterations. 

Roman buildings that can be seen today are the:
 Stadium 
 Theatre
 Roman forum
 Odeon
 Library
 City walls including the east gate and south gate
 Aqueducts
 Luxurious house known as the Domus Eirene
 treasury.

Extensive renovation and large-scale construction took place after the Roman conquest in 46 AD in order to meet the growing needs of the population. A characteristic of the buildings in Roman Philippopolis was their large scale and lavish decoration which expressed the greatness and influence of the Roman Empire.

In the Roman era the built-up area of Philippopolis in the plain totalled . It included around 150 insulae each with a width of 1 actus (35.5 m) and length of 2 actus (71 m). The existing street network was renovated and expanded with water supply and sewer system beneath it. The area of the road network amounted to 100,000 m2 The streets were paved with large granite slabs. The width of the streets was 15 Roman feet (4.4 m) while the width of the main streets reached 30 Roman feet (8.9 m).

In the 2nd c. AD, the area north of the forum was enhanced and important public buildings from the Hellenistic period like the theatre, the stadium, the agora, treasury and odeon were rebuilt and expanded.

City walls

The walls were originally built in the 4th c. BC around the Three Hills. In 172, according to an inscription found in the East Gate area from the reign of Emperor Marcus Aurelius, the city walls were strengthened on the three hills, and extended around the city in the plain in the areas to the east and west of the three hills, including, unusually, the stadium. Part of this wall can be seen today under Djumaya Square, next to the Stadium. However the wall was also built across part of the city lying to the south of the forum strangely leaving many buildings outside the protection of the walls. Eventually this area became derelict and was used as a cemetery where early Christian tombs have been discovered. Although damaged in 251 during the Gothic invasion, the walls were renovated in the 3rd and 4th centuries. After the Gothic invasions changes were made particularly in the East Gate complex. The earlier gate was abandoned and a new gate was added which included an existing triumphal arch in honour of Hadrian from the 2nd century.

Several remains of towers can be seen, including the eastern round tower.

The odeon was built as a Hellenistic Bouleuterion, or council chamber, and underwent four reconstructions between the 1st and 4th centuries for use as a small theatre.

Aqueducts

Three aqueducts of 22 km length supplied mainly the lower part of the city, while the hills relied on wells and rainwater tanks. The aqueducts run in parallel in the neighbourhood of the suburb of Komatevo at a separation of 30-40m, one a pipeline of clay pipes and two carried partially overhead on arches.

A section of the bridge of the "western" aqueduct, which is the considerably more massive one, has been partially restored on Komatevsko Shose. It is the only one standing today in Bulgaria. Piers are also visible at the Roman stadium. Recent excavations have revealed more of the piers dating from the 2nd c. AD.

It is assumed that the three aqueducts converged on the western slopes of Djendemtepe into a distribution tank (castellum aquae) which seems to have been destroyed in the construction of the modern tunnel.

The catchments at Markovo are well researched; one of them is an underground reservoir measuring 13 × 7 m, partially destroyed; the second is a complex tunnel system: a central gallery and side branches. It is not fully investigated, but the length of one of the lateral branches is 76 m.

The distribution network in the city itself is located under the streets, with pipelines along all north-south streets, but only under a few in east-west directions. Street pipelines are built with clay pipes, with branches to separate houses and fountains with lead. The pipelines led to many public fountains and fountains which, although not found, are known from many sculptural fragments.

The total water flow is estimated at around 43,000 m3 per day.

Late Roman period

Notable buildings that can be seen today are the:

 Great Basilica, Plovdiv
 Small Basilica, Plovdiv

The enormous Great Basilica with its magnificent floor mosaics has been excavated over many years and is now preserved in a new museum (2021).

Other archaeology

Recent excavations have revealed a 1st c. triumphal arch, only the 2nd in Bulgaria.

In 2018, a fragment from a Roman statue with an ancient Greek inscription was found which mentions the right of “proedria" (the right to take front row seats in the theatre. These were the honorary seats for the most honoured administrative and political figures) and the name Sozipatros.

In 2019, archaeologists found a large stone slab at the Episcopal Basilica site of the 3rd century AD. It was inscribed in Greek honouring the god Dionysus. The inscription reads: “For the victory, the health and the eternal existence of the emperors, Publius, Licinius Valerian and Gallien Augustin and for their whole house, for the holy senate and Roman people, and for the council and people's assembly of Philippopolis – the Thracian leader Dionysus dedicated the surviving mysteries, while the leader of the mysteries and eternal priest was Aurelius Mukianid, son of Mukian”. This is followed by a list of all 44 members of the mystical society, several with the positions they occupy.

References

Bibliography

Roman towns and cities in Bulgaria
Ancient cities of the Balkans
History of Plovdiv
Thracian towns
Populated places in ancient Thrace
Argead colonies
Catholic titular sees in Europe